Events in the year 1909 in Portugal.

Incumbents
 Monarch: Emmanuel II
 Prime Minister: Venceslau de Sousa Pereira de Lima (14 May – 22 December)

Events

Arts and entertainment

Sports
 26 October – The Olympic Committee of Portugal founded

Births
 11 February – João dos Santos, footballer.

Deaths

 8 September – José Dias Ferreira, lawyer and politician (born 1837)

References

 
1900s in Portugal
Years of the 20th century in Portugal
Portugal